Albibacter methylovorans  is a methylotrophic, aerobic and facultatively autotrophic bacteria from the genus Microvirga which has been isolated from dichloromethane contaminated ground water in Switzerland.

References

Further reading

External links
Type strain of Albibacter methylovorans at BacDive -  the Bacterial Diversity Metadatabase

Methylocystaceae
Bacteria described in 2001